Zuhn Bluff is a steep north-facing bluff standing about 5 miles (8 km) east-southeast of Mount Bramhall in the Walker Mountains of Thurston Island. Delineated from air photos taken by U.S. Navy Operation Highjump in December 1946. Named by Advisory Committee on Antarctic Names (US-ACAN) for Arthur A. Zuhn, physicist with the Byrd Antarctic Expedition in 1933–35.

Maps
 Thurston Island – Jones Mountains. 1:500000 Antarctica Sketch Map. US Geological Survey, 1967.
 Antarctic Digital Database (ADD). Scale 1:250000 topographic map of Antarctica. Scientific Committee on Antarctic Research (SCAR). Since 1993, regularly upgraded and updated.

Cliffs of Ellsworth Land